The Blackstone Building (formerly Blackstone's Department Store, now the Blackstone Apartments) is a 1916 structure located at 901 South Broadway in Los Angeles, California. It has been listed as a Los Angeles Historic-Cultural Monument since 2003 (number LA-765). The Blackstone Department Store Building is an early example of the work of John B. Parkinson, Los Angeles’ preeminent architect of the early 20th century, who also designed Bullocks Wilshire. The building is clad in gray terra cotta and styled in the Beaux Arts school.

History of Blackstone's

Nathaniel Blackstone (brother-in-law of department store magnate J. W. Robinson) opened Blackstone's Dry Goods in 1895 when J.W. Robinson Co. (commonly known as the "Boston Store" at that time) vacated its previous location at 171–173 Spring Street that year.

In 1898 they moved to the Douglas Building (then known as the "New" Stimson Block) at the northwest corner of Third and Spring streets, taking a  space on the ground floor, plus the entire basement.

In 1906-7, N. B. Blackstone Co. moved to 318–320-322 S. Broadway, in the new A. P. Johnson (or O. T. Johnson) building designed by Robert B. Young.

901 S. Broadway flagship
In 1916, Blackstone hired Parkinson to design his flagship store further south at the southwest corner of 9th and Broadway, with 90 feet of frontage on Broadway and 165 feet on 9th Street. It cost of $500,000, with 6 stories plus two basement levels, and opened on September 20, 1917.

In 1939, Blackstone’s was sold to the Famous Department Store Company, and renovated by Morgan, Walls & Clements. Stiles O. Clements designed a ground-floor façade in the Streamline Moderne style; this façade is now protected by an easement by the Los Angeles Conservancy.

Also it was the building behind Harold Lloyd in the famous scene when he is climbing another building and does those amazing stunts hanging from the building's clock — in the 1923 silent film "Safety Last". Blackstone's department stores received about 20 minutes of free advertising in a very popular film that year.

Current use
In 2010, the Blackstone Building was adaptively reused and converted to 82 apartments with ground-floor retail space and a subterranean parking garage.

References 

Buildings and structures in Downtown Los Angeles
Apartment buildings in Los Angeles
Commercial buildings in Los Angeles
Los Angeles Historic-Cultural Monuments
Commercial buildings completed in 1916
1916 establishments in California
1910s architecture in the United States
John and Donald Parkinson buildings
Morgan, Walls & Clements buildings